George Baker  was Bishop of Waterford and Lismore in the Church of Ireland from 1661 until 1665.

References

17th-century Anglican bishops in Ireland
Bishops of Waterford and Lismore (Church of Ireland)